Rockland may refer to:

People
Per Bergsland, nicknamed Peter Rockland, one of three successful escapees from Stalag Luft III (the "Great Escape")

Places
In Canada
Rockland, Greater Victoria
Rockland, Nova Scotia
Rockland, Ontario

In the United Kingdom
Rockland All Saints, a village in Norfolk
Rockland St Mary, a village in Norfolk
Rockland St Peter, a village in Norfolk
Rocklands, a civil parish in Norfolk comprising Rockland All Saints and Rockland St Peter

In the United States
Rockland, California
Rockland, Delaware
Rockland, Idaho
Rockland, Kentucky
Rockland, Maine
Rockland (Brooklandville, Maryland), a historic house
Rockland, Massachusetts
Rockland Township, Michigan
Rockland, Michigan
Rockland, New York 
Rockland County, New York
Palisades, New York, once known as Rockland
Rockland Psychiatric Center in Orangeburg, New York
Rockland Township, Pennsylvania (disambiguation) (multiple)
Rockland (Leesburg, Virginia), a historic house
Rockland, West Virginia (disambiguation) (multiple)
Rockland (Shepherdstown, West Virginia), a historic house
Rockland, Wisconsin (disambiguation) (multiple)

Other
 Rockland (Kim Mitchell album)
 Rockland Centre, a shopping mall in Quebec, Canada
 Rockland (Katzenjammer album)
 Rockland Records, a record label